The 2012 Team Speedway Junior World Championship was the eighth FIM Team Under-21 World Championship season. The final took place on 1 September, 2012 in Poland.

Results 
In the 2012 Final will be the host team Poland. Another finalist will be determined in two Semi-Finals in May.

Heat details

Qualifying round 
 21 April, 2012
 Rivne

Semifinal 1
 27 May, 2012
 Purfleet, Arena Essex Raceway

Semifinal 2
 28 May 2012
  Abensberg

World Final 
 1 September, 2012
  Gniezno, Stadion Start Gniezno S.A.

See also 
 2012 Speedway World Cup
 2012 Individual Speedway Junior World Championship

References 

2012
World Team Junior